Morpheis melanoleuca is a moth in the family Cossidae. It was described by Hermann Burmeister in 1878. It is found in Argentina.

References

Natural History Museum Lepidoptera generic names catalog

Zeuzerinae
Moths described in 1878